Tazeh Kand (also Romanized as Tāzeh Kand; also known as Tazakend) is a village in Golabar Rural District, in the Central District of Ijrud County, Zanjan Province, Iran. At the 2006 census, its population was 49, in 10 families.

References 

Populated places in Ijrud County